Buergeria oxycephala (Hainan stream treefrog or red-headed flying frog) is a species of frog in the family Rhacophoridae. It is endemic to Hainan Island, China.

Its natural habitats are subtropical or tropical moist lowland forests, rivers, and heavily degraded former forest.
It is threatened by habitat loss.

References

oxycephala
Amphibians of China
Endemic fauna of Hainan
Taxa named by George Albert Boulenger
Amphibians described in 1900
Taxonomy articles created by Polbot